Bomber Harris is a 1989 BBC television drama biography based on the life of Arthur Harris, who was Commander-in-chief of RAF Bomber Command during the Second World War.

John Thaw played the role of Harris during a period away from filming for Inspector Morse and Robert Hardy returned to the role of Winston Churchill, which had earned him a BAFTA nomination for Winston Churchill: The Wilderness Years. The drama was written by Don Shaw, produced by Innes Lloyd and directed by Michael Darlow.

Cast
 John Thaw – Arthur Travers Harris
 Robert Hardy – Winston Churchill
 Frederick Treves – Sir Charles Portal
 Bernard Kay – A.M. Sir Robert Saundby
 Sophie Thompson – Jillie Harris
 Richard Heffer – Group Captain Davidson
 Phil Brown – Lord Beaverbrook
Ronald Fletcher – BBC Newsreader
 David Healy – Lt. Gen. Ira Eaker USAAF
William Kerwin – Fred Walsh
 Roger Llewellyn – Rev. John Collins
 John Nettleton – Wing Commander Harry Weldon
 David Quilter – Principal Medical Officer
 Roy Spencer – Magnus Spence
Julian Harries - Flight Lieutenant John Maze
 Ronald Lacey – RAF Officer (uncredited)

External links

1989 television films
1989 films
British television films
British biographical films
British aviation films
British World War II films
Cultural depictions of Winston Churchill
1980s British films